The Zigzag River is a tributary, about  long, of the Sandy River in the U.S. state of Oregon. The Zigzag and one of its major tributaries, the Little Zigzag River, drain the Zigzag Glacier on Mount Hood, a high volcanic peak in the Cascade Range. Their waters flow westward to meet the Sandy River near the community of Zigzag.

The dramatic topography of the Mississippi Head escarpment dominates the upper Zigzag River, where the  Timberline Trail crosses the Zigzag River and the Paradise Park Loop Trail crosses a tributary.  Avalanches have necessitated rebuilding of the Timberline Trail switchbacks on the southeast side of the river; the Pacific Crest Trail also follows this route.

Seventy-five-foot (23 m) Little Zigzag Falls on the Little Zigzag River is one of the three most popular off-road locations in the Zigzag basin, along with Mirror Lake on the Camp Creek tributary and the area just west of Timberline Lodge under three ski lifts which drains into the largest tributary, Still Creek.

Other than 11,239-foot (3426 m) Mount Hood, the highest point in the Zigzag watershed is  Devils Peak which has a fire tower now used by overnight hikers.  This area is under consideration in the 2007 Oregon Wilderness Area bill before congress for addition to the Salmon-Huckleberry Wilderness.  The northern part of the watershed and the uppermost Zigzag River are in the Mount Hood Wilderness.

According to American Whitewater, the last  of the Zigzag River, from Tollgate to the Sandy River, has been rated Class III (difficult) to IV (very difficult) on the International Scale of River Difficulty for whitewater boating.

Although the Zigzag River is closed to salmon and steelhead fishing, it offers catch-and-release fishing for coastal cutthroat trout.

See also
 List of Oregon rivers
 Zigzag Mountain

References

External links
Sandy River Basin Watershed Council

Rivers of Oregon
Mount Hood
Rivers of Clackamas County, Oregon
Mount Hood National Forest
Wild and Scenic Rivers of the United States